Beijing Financial Street (BFS) is where Chinese regulatory agencies are located. It is located inside Beijing's innermost 2nd Ring Road. According to the 13th 5 years plan, Beijing Financial Street will be positioned more towards a regulatory agencies' precinct.

The central bank's headquarters as well as three national regulatory commissions of the central government are located here. They are the People's Bank of China (PBoC), the China Banking Regulatory Commission (CBRC), the China Securities Regulatory Commission (CSRC), and the China Insurance Regulatory Commission (CIRC).

Beijing Financial Street is being developed by Beijing Financial Street Holding Company, Ltd. The architectural firm of Skidmore, Owings & Merrill; along with SWA landscape architects prepared the urban plan, landscape and the building design guidelines for the Central Park area of Financial Street currently in construction with build-out scheduled for 2008. The building facilities are designed around interior courtyards, a design concept which typifies the ancient Hutong neighborhoods surrounding the Forbidden City.

Buildings 
(North to south, numerical order)

<ref>http://www.zhaotai.com.cn<ref>

See also
 Beijing central business district
 List of economic and technological development zones in Beijing

References

<ref>http://www.cebbank.com.cn<ref>

External links
 Beijing Financial Street Website
  Beijing Financial Street 3D Guide

Economy of Beijing
Financial districts in China
Streets in Beijing
Xicheng District